are a Japanese idol group.  It consists of singer "Ayumi", DJ "Kurika" and hype-woman "Maki".  The three girls are managed by Id Entertainment agency.

History

2012: Origins and formation
Kurika and Maki met as high-school classmates in Kobe prefecture, and started out as a DJ unit Kurikamaki (くりかまき) in January, 2012.  Since the Japanese abbreviation of their name makes the word "kuma", which means bear in Japanese, they dress up in bear costumes and claim to be 3-year-old bears.  They posted their DJ performance on Niconico, which caught the management agency's attention.  They officially started their activity in November 2012, performing as an opening DJ in over 20 events a month.

2013-2014: Indie kuma era
They released their first CD single "アナログマガール" (Analoguma-girl) on August 21, 2013, ranking 136 in Oricon weekly chart.  They released their second CD single "クマトナデシコ" (Kumatonadeshiko) on March 21, 2014, ranking 41 in the Oricon weekly chart.  One of the CD's B-side tracks, ”春色ディスカバリー feat. ともだち” (Seishun Discovery featuring Tomodachi), featured Ayumi, a girl in the same management agency.  Her singing caught Kurikamaki's attention, and they claim to have persuaded her to join their group for over 5 months.  On May 5, 2014, Ayumi officially joined Kurikamaki, and the group's name was changed to Ayumikurikamaki, which is frequently abbreviated as Ayukuma.  On July 22, 2014, they released their first CD single as Ayumikurikamaki "ジェットクマスター" (Jet kumastar) on July 22, 2014, ranking 23 in the Oricon weekly chart.

2015-7/2016: Major kuma era
They debuted on a major record label with the single "鮭鮭鮭" ("Shakeh Shakeh Shakeh", which translates to "Salmon Salmon Salmon") on March 4, 2015, ranking 11 in the Oricon Singles Chart.  They released their second major single "蜜蜜蜜" (Honey Honey Honey) on June 24, 2015.  It reached number 9 on the Oricon chart, and it was their first single to rank in Oricon weekly chart's top 10.  It was also an ending theme for the anime Punch Line.  They released their third major single "心友フォーエヴァー" ("Shin-yuu Forever", which roughly means "Best Friend Forever") on November 25, 2015, ranking 17 in the Oricon Singles Chart.

On December 27, 2015, the members got involved in a car accident.  The vehicle they were in rolled over due to a tire burst, leaving them with sprains and bruises bad enough to cancel several planned live events.  However, they successfully restarted their activity with a live concert on January 31, 2016.

They released their first album "あゆみくりかまきがやって来る！クマァ！クマァ！クマァ！" (Ayumikurikamaki ga yattekuru! Kuma! Kuma! Kuma!) on April 13, 2016.  Its title and art were inspired from The Beatles.  It ranked 8 in the Oricon Albums Chart.

On May 12, 2016, the group announced that they can continue to perform as bears only until their solo live concert on July 8, 2016, after which they must perform as humans.  They also announced that they can return to being bears only if they can announce until the end of 2017 a solo live concert at Nippon Budokan.

7/2016-present: Major human era
On November 23, 2016, they released their fourth major single "旅立ちの唄" ("Tabidachi-no-Uta", which roughly means "Song of Departure").  It was their first release as humans, and ranked 27 in the Oricon Singles Chart.

Live performance
Ayumikurikamaki's solo live concerts consist of a DJ part where they mix recorded music for an audience, and a second part where they perform their original songs.  They sing "I Met A Bear" only in live concerts, and circle pit is sometimes formed.  They announce beforehand the type of cheering to be done in the next concert: TTD, a moderate cheering, and DIM, an aggressive cheering.  TTD stands for "To Tokyo Dome", and is mainly for a free live and in-store events where they want to attract new fans.  DIM stands for "Donna Idol nimo Makenaizo", and is for their solo concerts, as well as idol and subcultural events.

Original terminology and cheering
Matagi: They call their fans matagi, which means animal hunter in Japanese.  It is sometimes abbreviated to MTG.
Nikukyuu Kecak: Raising both hands with all fingers bent at second joints.  Nikukyuu means paw in Japanese.
Analoguma-tonton: Jumping with a hand raised diagonally that occurs during a performance of Analoguma-girl.

Discography

CD singles

CD albums

References

Japanese idol groups
Japanese girl groups
Japanese pop rock music groups
Japanese electropop groups
Japanese dance music groups
Musical groups established in 2012
2012 establishments in Japan
Japanese pop music groups
Musical groups from Tokyo